Spofford may refer to:
 Spofford, New Hampshire
 Spofford Lake
 Spofford Juvenile Center, New York City
 Spofford, Texas
 Spofford (play), a 1967 play

People with the surname
 Ainsworth Rand Spofford (1825–1908), Librarian of Congress, 1864–1897
 Charles Spofford (1902–1991), lawyer
 Edward Spofford, American professor of literature
 Harriet Elizabeth Prescott Spofford (1835–1921), American writer
 Henry M. Spofford (1821–1880), 19th-century Louisiana politician
 Sally Hoyt Spofford (1914–2002), American ornithologist 
 William B. Spofford (1921–2013), Episcopal bishop

See also
 Otis Spofford, a children's novel
 Spafford
 Spofforth, North Yorkshire, England, UK
 Spofforth Castle